T A Dellaca Ltd v PDL Industries Ltd [1992] 3 NZLR 88 is a cited case in New Zealand regarding  the requirement of some form of signature on a document required under the Contracts Enforcement Act (1956).

References

High Court of New Zealand cases
New Zealand contract case law
1991 in New Zealand law
1991 in case law